The Big South Conference offers multiple annual baseball awards. These awards include the Coach of the Year, the Player of the Year, the Pitcher of the Year and the Freshmen of the year. The most recent winners are, respectively, Joe Raccuia, Cole Hallum, Jared Lyons and Bobby Holmes. The conference also has a yearly All-Big South first team and second team, as well as an All-Academic team.BigSouthSports.com

References

Big South Conference baseball
College baseball conference trophies and awards in the United States